Qualification for the women's tournament at the 2014 Winter Olympics determined by the IIHF World Ranking following the 2012 IIHF Women's World Championships. The top five teams in the World Ranking received automatic berths into the Olympics, Russia received an automatic berth as host, and all other teams had an opportunity to qualify for the remaining two spots.

Qualified teams

Notes

IIHF World Ranking

Olympic preliminary qualification
Group G was played 12–14 October in Barcelona, while Group H was played 27–30 September in Jastrzebie-Zdroj. Denmark and Slovenia were the expected hosts, being the nations ranked 19th and 20th respectively amongst participating nations. The winners of each tournament advanced to the Olympic Pre-Qualification tournaments in November of the same year.

Group G

All times are local (UTC+2).

Group H

All times are local (UTC+2).

Olympic pre-qualification
The two preliminary round winners joined the nations ranked thirteen to eighteen. Two round robins were played from 8–11 November 2012 in Shanghai and Valmiera. The winners of each group advanced to the final qualification tournaments.

Group E

All times are local (UTC+8).

Group F

All times are local (UTC+2).

Final qualification
The two pre-qualification winners joined the nations ranked seventh through twelfth, to determine the final two olympic qualifiers. Two round robins were played from 7–10 February 2013 in Poprad  and Weiden. The winners of each group qualified for the olympics.

Group C

All times are local (UTC+1).

Group D

All times are local (UTC+1).

References

External links
2009 Official Site
Official 2010 Olympic Site
Official 2011 Site
Official 2012 Site
2014 Olympic format and qualification

Qualification
Qualification for the 2014 Winter Olympics
Oly
2014 in women's sport